Taft Richardson (September 2, 1943 – November 30, 2008) was an American folk artist who sculptured art images out of dried animal bones. Taft enjoyed creating sculptured images from bones like spiders, snakes and maps. He made an image of the continent of Africa out of tiny pieces of bone fragments. Taft often said that he did not just create art for just viewing but he also for spiritual and religious reasons. It looked like a giant snake dressed in armor. He called it the King James version in the bible, "Abaddon".

Early life (1943–1978)
Taft Richardson Jr. was born on September 2, 1943 in Lumberton, Florida, to Taft Richardson Sr and Mary Turner. When he was about five years old his parents moved him and his other siblings to Sulfur Springs, a district in the city of Tampa, Florida. At the age of seven, he was baptized at Spring Hill Missionary Baptist Church. He attended his early school years in a church owned by his relatives. He later attended and graduated from a segregated all-black high school. He married his first wife at the age of 19 he later separated. At the age of 22 Taft began to collect Bone and Skulls of differed domestics animals like chicken, Ox and lamb bones and as symbol them into forms and images that he day dreams about and in visions and glued them together and make Art sculptures. He began showing his mother his work and she was very please at his gift. He also display the art work to friend and other relative who complemented him.

In the late 1960s, Taft wanted to show his art to the world and left Tampa Florida and moved to Washington DC to pursue his art career. In DC he got his first job working at General Hospital. He later got a position at Howard University Medical Hospital with the help of one of good friends Walter Lattimore (father of R&B singer Kenny Lattimore). At Howard University he worked and studied Nuclear Medicine. Taft, then a young man in his late twenties, spent a great deal of his off time working on his art work and displayed his Art work at Work shows in parks and youth centers around the city. In past times He mingled with artists, politicians, activists and popular celebrities visiting town. Washington DC was mostly African American populated city and it was here were young blacks flaunted Music, acting and political influence. Taft showed great interest's in politics and civil human rights. In America the late 1960s and 1970s Black American were demanding and fighting for equality living in the United States. Taft admired Civil rights Icons like Martin Luther King and Malcolm X. and Black activist Groups Like The Black Panthers and Black militants who voiced their view of the mistreatment and killing of black people around the nation. In the streets of DC. A young Taft at the time supported and admired the views and opinions of these groups but was never a was formal member of these originations. Thus All of this mention had a great influence and impact on the future of Taft Art work. Taft decided he wanted to voice his opinions and views through his Art work to the world using bones and skulls. 
 
Taft began to display his art work to the public, on busy city street corners and in neighborhood parks and Art center public shows. He opened his first gallery on Kennedy St NW DC in the late 70s with two local artist Leroy and Elbert, which they called T.E.L. gallery, on his return to Tampa he would start two more art museums Mary's House of Israel, and in late 1980's The Moses House art gallery.

National  (1971–2008)
In the early 1970s Taft took his art creation on tour. He traveled around the U.S from east to west doing art shows and exhibits,  from New York City to the state of California. He appeared regularly on television shows and he has been written about in dozens of newspaper articles around the world. In the Tampa Tribune newspaper the whole LifeStyle section was dedicated to him.

Personal life  

Taft In 2007 Taft became ill. He continued working on his last piece of art until his death in November 2008.
He was the father of Sharon Moultry, Anthony Richardson, Hebert and Herbert Richardson,Taft Richardson 3rd, Dexter Myers, Pamela (Richardson) Hackley, Travis Richardson,Cheryl Richardson.

More Taft Richardson Links

http://folkvine.umbc.edu/richardson/watchandpray.html
https://www.legacy.com/obituaries/name/taft-richardson-obituary?pid=120885416
https://www.sulphurspringsmuseum.org/post/taft-richardson-jr

Related Links

1943 births
2008 deaths
People from Pasco County, Florida
African-American artists
American artists
Folk artists
20th-century African-American people
21st-century African-American people